Pretty/Handsome is a 2008 television production by Ryan Murphy that was not picked up by FX. According to Vogue, Murphy "was devastated when the studio he was working with decided not to pursue the show because they felt their advertisers wouldn’t support it".

Plot 
Bob, a married person with two sons, has to come out to her family as a transgender woman.

Cast
 Joseph Fiennes as Bob Fitzpayne
 David Lambert as young Bob Fitzpayne
 Blythe Danner as Bunny Fitzpayne, Bob's mother
 Robert Wagner as Scotch Fitzpayne, Bob's father
 Carrie-Anne Moss  as Elizabeth 'Liz' Fitzpayne
 Jake Cherry as Oliver Fitzpayne
 Jonathan Groff as Patrick Fitzpayne
 Jessica Lowndes as Cassie Boothe
 Christopher Egan as Beckett
 Sarah Paulson as Corky Fromme

Production 
The project began shooting in the end of October 2007. The original title of the project was 4 oz., but was later changed to Pretty/Handsome. FX did not pick the show to be a regular series. After Pretty/Handsome, Murphy worked on Glee because he "wanted to develop a wholesome comedy that the entire family can watch".

References

External links 

 

2008 in American television
Television pilots not picked up as a series
Transgender-related television shows
Unaired television pilots
Works by Ryan Murphy (writer)